The 2000 Heineken Open was a men's ATP tennis tournament held in Auckland, New Zealand. The event was part of the International Series of the 2000 ATP Tour and was played on outdoor hard courts. It was the 33rd edition of the tournament and was held from 10 January through 15 January 2000. Second-seeded Magnus Norman won the singles title.

Finals

Singles

 Magnus Norman defeated  Michael Chang 3–6, 6–3, 7–5
 It was Norman's 1st title of the year and the 8th of his career.

Doubles

 Ellis Ferreira /  Rick Leach defeated  Olivier Delaître /  Jeff Tarango 7–5, 6–4
 It was Ferreira's 1st title of the year and the 13th of his career. It was Leach's 1st title of the year and the 38th of his career.

References

External links
 
 ATP – tournament profile
 ITF – tournament edition details

 
Heineken Open
Heineken Open, 2000
ATP Auckland Open
January 2000 sports events in New Zealand